Lobat Vala (born 1930 in Tehran) is an Iranian poet
and campaigner for the Women Liberation and Equal Rights in Iran.

Early life 
Having been exiled from Iran since 1979, Vala lives in London, and she lived in Melbourne between 1980 and 1984. While there, she obtained an MA in Middle Eastern Studies from University of Melbourne and in London worked as a journalist and writer in Keyhan weekly newspaper until 2006.  Vala has published several poetry books in Persian.

References

External links 
City of Poetry Lovers; In Teheran, Where Verse Is a Passion, The Styles Mingle and Often Clash (The New York Times) (subscription required)

Iranian dissidents
Living people
20th-century Iranian poets
Iranian women activists
Iranian women's rights activists
1930 births
University of Melbourne alumni
20th-century Persian-language writers
Exiles of the Iranian Revolution in the United Kingdom
Writers from Tehran
Writers from London
Iranian emigrants to the United Kingdom
Iranian women writers
Iranian women journalists
Newspaper writers
Writers from Melbourne
Iranian women poets
Exiles of the Iranian Revolution in Australia
21st-century Iranian poets